1914 United States House of Representatives elections were elections for the United States House of Representatives to elect members to serve in the 64th United States Congress. They were held for the most part on November 3, 1914, while Maine held theirs on September 14. They were held in the middle of President Woodrow Wilson's first term.

The opposition Republican Party had recovered from the split they underwent during the 1912 presidential election, and the party gained more than 60 seats from the Democratic Party, though not enough to regain control of the body. The burgeoning economy greatly aided Republicans, who pushed for pro-business principles and took credit for the success that had been reached in the industrial sector. Many progressive Republicans rejoined the Republican Party, but six remained under the Progressive Party banner in the new Congress.

Election summaries

Early election date
Maine held its elections early, on September 14, 1914.  There had previously been multiple states with earlier elections, but Maine was the only one remaining by 1914 (after Vermont stopped holding its elections early, after 1912).  Maine would continue to hold elections early, in September, until 1958.

Special elections 

|-
! 
| Irvin S. Pepper
|  | Democratic
| 1910
|  | Incumbent died December 22, 1913.New representantative elected February 10, 1914.Democratic hold.
| nowrap | 

|-
! 
| James Michael Curley
|  | Democratic
| 1910
|  | Incumbent resigned February 4, 1914, to become Mayor of Boston.New member elected April 7, 1914.Democratic hold.
| nowrap | 

|-
! 
| Robert G. Bremner
|  | Democratic
| 1912
|  | Incumbent died February 5, 1914.New member elected April 7, 1914.Republican gain.
| nowrap | 

|-
! 
| William N. Richardson
|  | Democratic
| 1900 
|  | Incumbent died March 31, 1914.New member elected May 11, 1914.Democratic hold.
| nowrap | 

|-
! 
| Henry De Lamar Clayton Jr.
|  | Democratic
| 1896
|  | Incumbent resigned May 25, 1914, to become Judge for the Middle and Northern District of Alabama.New member elected June 29, 1914.Democratic hold.Winner was not elected to the next term, see below.
| nowrap | 

|-
! 
| Thomas W. Hardwick
|  | Democratic
| 1902
|  | Incumbent resigned November 2, 1914, to become U.S. Senator.New member elected November 3, 1914.Democratic hold.
| nowrap | 

|-
! 
| James Harry Covington
|  | Democratic
| 1908
|  | Incumbent resigned September 30, 1914, to become Chief Justice of the Supreme Court of the District of Columbia.New member elected November 3, 1914.Democratic hold.
| nowrap | 

|}

Alabama 

|-
! 
| George W. Taylor
|  | Democratic
| 1896
|  | Incumbent retired.New member elected.Democratic hold.
|  Oscar Lee Gray (Democratic) Unopposed
|-
!
| S. Hubert Dent Jr.
|  | Democratic
| 1908
| Incumbent re-elected.
|  S. Hubert Dent Jr. (Democratic) Unopposed
|-
!
| William Oscar Mulkey
|  | Democratic
| 1914 
|  | Incumbent retired.New member elected.Democratic hold. 
|  Henry B. Steagall (Democratic) Unopposed
|-
!
| Fred L. Blackmon
|  | Democratic
| 1908
| Incumbent re-elected.
|  Fred L. Blackmon (Democratic) Unopposed
|-
!
| J. Thomas Heflin
|  | Democratic
| 1904 
| Incumbent re-elected.
|  J. Thomas Heflin (Democratic) Unopposed
|-
!
| Richmond P. Hobson
|  | Democratic
| 1906
|  | Incumbent lost renomination.New member elected.Democratic hold.
| 
|-
!
| John L. Burnett
|  | Democratic
| 1898
| Incumbent re-elected.
| 
|-
!
| Oscar Underwood
|  | Democratic
| 1896
|  | Incumbent retired to run for U.S. Senator.New member elected.Democratic hold.
| 
|-
!
| Christopher C. Harris
|  | Democratic
| 1914 
|  | Incumbent retired.New member elected.Democratic hold.
| 
|-
!
| John W. Abercrombie
|  | Democratic
| 1912
| Incumbent re-elected.
| 
|}

Arizona 

|-
! 
| Carl Hayden
|  | Democratic
| 1911
| Incumbent re-elected.
| nowrap | 

|}

Arkansas 

|-
! 
| Thaddeus H. Caraway
|  | Democratic
| 1912
| Incumbent re-elected.
|  Thaddeus H. Caraway (Democratic) Unopposed
|-
! 
| William Allan Oldfield
|  | Democratic
| 1908
| Incumbent re-elected.
|  William Allan Oldfield (Democratic) Unopposed
|-
! 
| John C. Floyd
|  | Democratic
| 1904
|  | Incumbent retired.New member elected.Democratic hold.
| 
|-
!
| Otis Wingo
|  | Democratic
| 1912
| Incumbent re-elected.
|
|-
! 
| Henderson M. Jacoway
|  | Democratic
| 1910
| Incumbent re-elected.
| Henderson M. Jacoway (Democratic) Unopposed
|-
! 
| Samuel M. Taylor
|  | Democratic
| 1912
| Incumbent re-elected.
| Samuel M. Taylor (Democratic) Unopposed
|-
! 
| William S. Goodwin
|  | Democratic
| 1910
| Incumbent re-elected.
| William S. Goodwin (Democratic) Unopposed
|-
|}

California 

|-
! 
| William Kent
|  | Independent
| 1910
| Incumbent re-elected.
| 
|-
! 
| John E. Raker
|  | Democratic
| 1910
| Incumbent re-elected.
| 
|-
! 
| Charles F. Curry
|  | Republican
| 1912
| Incumbent re-elected.
| 
|-
! 
| Julius Kahn
|  | Republican
| 1898
| Incumbent re-elected.
| 
|-
! 
| John I. Nolan
|  | Republican
| 1912
| Incumbent re-elected.
| 
|-
! 
| Joseph R. Knowland
|  | Republican
| 1904
|  | Incumbent retired. New member elected.Progressive gain.
| 
|-
! 
| Denver S. Church
|  | Democratic
| 1912
| Incumbent re-elected.
| 
|-
! 
| Everis A. Hayes
|  | Republican
| 1904
| Incumbent re-elected.
| 
|-
! 
| Charles W. Bell
|  | Progressive
| 1912
|  | Incumbent lost re-election.New member elected.Prohibition gain.
| 
|-
! 
| William Stephens
|  | Progressive
| 1910
| Incumbent re-elected.
| 
|-
! 
| William Kettner
|  | Democratic
| 1912
| Incumbent re-elected.
| 
|}

Colorado 

|-
! 
| George Kindel
|  | Democratic
| 1912
|  | Incumbent retired to run for U.S. Senator.New member elected.Democratic hold.
| 
|-
!
| Harry H. Seldomridge
|  | Democratic
| 1912
|  | Incumbent lost re-election.New member elected.Republican gain.
| 
|-
!
| Edward KeatingRedistricted from the at-large district
|  | Democratic
| 1912
| Incumbent re-elected.
| 
|-
!
| Edward T. TaylorRedistricted from the at-large district
|  | Democratic
| 1908
| Incumbent re-elected.
| 
|}

Connecticut 
During this election season, the at-large seat was eliminated, and Connecticut's 5th congressional district was created.

|-
! 
| Augustine Lonergan
|  | Democratic
| 1912
|  | Incumbent lost re-election.New member elected.Republican gain.
| 
|-
!
| Bryan F. Mahan
|  | Democratic
| 1912
|  | Incumbent lost re-election.New member elected.Republican gain.
| 
|-
!
| Thomas L. Reilly
|  | Democratic
| 1912
|  | Incumbent lost re-election.New member elected.Republican gain.
| 
|-
!
| Jeremiah Donovan
|  | Democratic
| 1912
|  | Incumbent lost re-election.New member elected.Republican gain.
| 
|-
!
| William Kennedy
|  | Democratic
| 1912
|  | Incumbent lost re-election.New member elected.Republican gain.
| 
|}

Delaware 

|-
! 
| Franklin Brockson
|  | Democratic
| 1912
|  | Incumbent lost re-election.New member elected.Republican gain.
| nowrap | 

|}

Florida 

An at-large district had been created in 1912 for a newly apportioned seat.  The at-large district was eliminated in 1914 and the  created.

|-
! 
| Stephen M. Sparkman
|  | Democratic
| 1894
| Incumbent re-elected.
| 
|-
!
| Frank Clark
|  | Democratic
| 1904
| Incumbent re-elected.
| 
|-
! 
| Emmett Wilson
|  | Democratic
| 1912
| Incumbent re-elected.
| 
|-
! 
| Claude L'EngleRedistricted from the at-large district
|  | Democratic
| 1912
|  | Incumbent lost renomination.New member elected.Democratic hold.
| 
|}

Georgia 

|-
! 
| Charles Gordon Edwards
|  | Democratic
| 1906
| Incumbent re-elected.
| 
|-
!
| Frank Park
|  | Democratic
| 1913 
| Incumbent re-elected.
| 
|-
!
| Charles R. Crisp
|  | Democratic
| 1912
| Incumbent re-elected.
| 
|-
!
| William C. Adamson
|  | Democratic
| 1896
| Incumbent re-elected.
| 
|-
!
| William S. Howard
|  | Democratic
| 1896
| Incumbent re-elected.
| 
|-
!
| Charles L. Bartlett
|  | Democratic
| 1896
|  | Incumbent retired.New member elected.Democratic hold.
| 
|-
!
| Gordon Lee
|  | Democratic
| 1904
| Incumbent re-elected.
| 
|-
!
| Samuel J. Tribble
|  | Democratic
| 1910
| Incumbent re-elected.
| 
|-
!
| Thomas Montgomery Bell
|  | Democratic
| 1904
| Incumbent re-elected.
| 
|-
!
| Carl Vinson
|  | Democratic
| 1914 
| Incumbent re-elected.
| 
|-
!
| John R. Walker
|  | Democratic
| 1912
| Incumbent re-elected.
| 
|-
!
| Dudley M. Hughes
|  | Democratic
| 1912
| Incumbent re-elected.
| 
|}

Idaho 

|-
! rowspan=2 | 
| Burton L. French
|  | Republican
| nowrap | 1910
|  | Incumbent retired to run for U.S. Senator.New member elected.Republican hold.
| nowrap rowspan=2 | 

|-
| Addison T. Smith
|  | Republican
| nowrap | 1912
| Incumbent re-elected.

|}

Illinois 

|-
! 
| Martin B. Madden
|  | Republican
| 1902
| Incumbent re-elected.
| 
|-
!
| James R. Mann
|  | Republican
| 1896
| Incumbent re-elected.
| 
|-
!
| George E. Gorman
|  | Democratic
| 1912
|  | Incumbent retired.New member elected.Republican gain.
| 
|-
!
| James T. McDermott
|  | Democratic
| 1912
|  |Incumbent resigned and re-elected to fill his own seat. Democratic hold.
| 
|-
!
| Adolph J. Sabath
|  | Democratic
| 1906
| Incumbent re-elected.
| 
|-
!
| James McAndrews
|  | Democratic
| 1900
1904 (retired)

1912
| Incumbent re-elected.
| 
|-
!
| Frank Buchanan
|  | Democratic
| 1910
| Incumbent re-elected.
| 
|-
!
| Thomas Gallagher
|  | Democratic
| 1908
| Incumbent re-elected.
| 
|-
!
| Frederick A. Britten
|  | Republican
| 1912
| Incumbent re-elected.
| 
|-
!
| Charles M. Thomson
|  | Progressive
| 1912
|  | Incumbent lost re-election.New member elected.Republican gain.
| 
|-
!
| Ira C. Copley
|  | Republican
| 1910
|  | Incumbent re-elected as a Progressive.Progressive gain.
| 
|-
!
| William H. Hinebaugh
|  | Progressive
| 1910
|  | Incumbent lost re-election.New member elected.Republican gain.
| 
|-
!
| John C. McKenzie
|  | Republican
| 1910
| Incumbent re-elected.
| 
|-
!
| Clyde H. Tavenner
|  | Democratic
| 1912
| Incumbent re-elected.
| 
|-
!
| Stephen A. Hoxworth
|  | Democratic
| 1912
|  | Incumbent retired.New member elected.Republican gain.
| 
|-
!
| Claude U. Stone
|  | Democratic
| 1910
| Incumbent re-elected.
| 
|-
!
| Louis FitzHenry
|  | Democratic
| 1912
|  | Incumbent lost re-election.New member elected.Republican gain.
| 
|-
!
| Frank T. O'Hair
|  | Democratic
| 1912
|  | Incumbent lost re-election.New member elected.Republican gain.
| 
|-
!
| Charles M. Borchers
|  | Democratic
| 1912
|  | Incumbent lost re-election.New member elected.Republican gain.
| 
|-
!
| Henry T. Rainey
|  | Democratic
| 1902
| Incumbent re-elected.
| 
|-
!
| James M. Graham
|  | Democratic
| 1908
|  | Incumbent lost re-election.New member elected.Republican gain.
| 
|-
!
| William N. Baltz
|  | Democratic
| 1912
|  | Incumbent lost re-election.New member elected.Republican gain.
| 
|-
!
| Martin D. Foster
|  | Democratic
| 1906
| Incumbent re-elected.
| 
|-
!
| H. Robert Fowler
|  | Democratic
| 1910
|  | Incumbent lost re-election.New member elected.Republican gain.
| 
|-
!
| Robert P. Hill
|  | Democratic
| 1912
|  | Incumbent lost re-election.New member elected.Republican gain.
| 
|-
! rowspan=4 | 
| Lawrence B. Stringer
| 
| 1912
|  | Incumbent retired to run for U.S. Senator.New member elected.Republican gain.
| rowspan=4 nowrap | 
|-
| William E. Williams
| 
| 1912
| Incumbent re-elected.
|}

Indiana 

|-
! 
| Charles Lieb
|  | Democratic
| 1912
| Incumbent re-elected.
| 
|-
!
| William A. Cullop
|  | Democratic
| 1908
| Incumbent re-elected.
| 
|-
!
| William E. Cox
|  | Democratic
| 1906
| Incumbent re-elected.
| 
|-
!
| Lincoln Dixon
|  | Democratic
| 1904
| Incumbent re-elected.
| 
|-
!
| Ralph Wilbur Moss
|  | Democratic
| 1908
| Incumbent re-elected.
| 
|-
!
| Finly H. Gray
|  | Democratic
| 1910
| Incumbent re-elected.
| 
|-
!
| Charles A. Korbly
|  | Democratic
| 1908
|  | Incumbent lost re-election.New member elected.Republican gain.
| 
|-
!
| John A. M. Adair
|  | Democratic
| 1906
| Incumbent re-elected.
| 
|-
!
| Martin A. Morrison
|  | Democratic
| 1908
| Incumbent re-elected.
| 
|-
!
| John B. Peterson
|  | Democratic
| 1912
|  | Incumbent lost re-election.New member elected.Republican gain.
| 
|-
!
| George W. Rauch
|  | Democratic
| 1906
| Incumbent re-elected.
| 
|-
!
| Cyrus Cline
|  | Democratic
| 1908
| Incumbent re-elected.
| 
|-
!
| Henry A. Barnhart
|  | Democratic
| 1908 
| Incumbent re-elected.
| 
|}

Iowa 

|-
! 
| Charles A. Kennedy
|  | Republican
| 1906
| Incumbent re-elected.
| 
|-
!
| Henry Vollmer
|  | Democratic
| 1914 (special)
|  | Incumbent retired.New member elected.Republican gain.
| 
|-
!
| Maurice Connolly
|  | Democratic
| 1912
|  | Incumbent retired to run for U.S. Senator.New member elected.Republican gain.
| 
|-
!
| Gilbert N. Haugen
|  | Republican
| 1898
| Incumbent re-elected.
| 
|-
!
| James W. Good
|  | Republican
| 1908
| Incumbent re-elected.
| 
|-
!
| Sanford Kirkpatrick
|  | Democratic
| 1912
|  | Incumbent lost renomination.New member elected.Republican gain.
| 
|-
!
| Charles E. Patton
|  | Republican
| 1910
|  | Incumbent retired.New member elected.Republican hold.
| 
|-
!
| Horace M. Towner
|  | Republican
| 1910
| Incumbent re-elected.
| 
|-
!
| William R. Green
|  | Republican
| 1911 (special)
| Incumbent re-elected.
| 
|-
!
| Frank P. Woods
|  | Republican
| 1908
| Incumbent re-elected.
| 
|-
!
| George Cromwell Scott
|  | Republican
| 1912
|  | Incumbent lost re-election.New member elected.Democratic gain.
| 

|}

Kansas 

|-
! 
| Daniel R. Anthony Jr.
|  | Republican
| 1907 
| Incumbent re-elected.
| 
|-
!
| Joseph Taggart
|  | Democratic
| 1911 
| Incumbent re-elected.
| 
|-
!
| Philip P. Campbell
|  | Republican
| 1902
| Incumbent re-elected.
| 
|-
! 
| Dudley Doolittle
|  | Democratic
| 1912
| Incumbent re-elected.
| 
|-
!
| Guy T. Helvering
|  | Democratic
| 1912
| Incumbent re-elected.
| 
|-
!
| John R. Connelly
|  | Democratic
| 1912
| Incumbent re-elected.
| 
|-
!
| George A. Neeley
|  | Democratic
| 1912 
|  | Incumbent retired to run for U.S. Senator.New member elected.Democratic hold.
| 
|-
!
| Victor Murdock
|  | Republican
| 1902
|  | Incumbent retired to run for U.S. Senator.New member elected.Democratic gain.
| 
|}

Kentucky 

|-
! 
| Alben W. Barkley
|  | Democratic
| 1912
| Incumbent re-elected.
| 
|-
!
| Augustus O. Stanley
|  | Democratic
| 1902
|  | Incumbent retired to run for U.S. Senator.New member elected.Democratic hold.
| 
|-
!
| Robert Y. Thomas Jr.
|  | Democratic
| 1908
| Incumbent re-elected.
| 
|-
!
| Ben Johnson
|  | Democratic
| 1906
| Incumbent re-elected.
| 
|-
!
| J. Swagar Sherley
|  | Democratic
| 1902
| Incumbent re-elected.
| 
|-
!
| Arthur B. Rouse
|  | Democratic
| 1910
| Incumbent re-elected.
| 
|-
!
| J. Campbell Cantrill
|  | Democratic
| 1908
| Incumbent re-elected.
| 
|-
! 
| Harvey Helm
|  | Democratic
| 1906
| Incumbent re-elected.
| 
|-
!
| William J. Fields
|  | Democratic
| 1910
| Incumbent re-elected.
| 
|-
!
| John W. Langley
|  | Republican
| 1906
| Incumbent re-elected.
| 
|-
!
| Caleb Powers
|  | Republican
| 1910
| Incumbent re-elected.
| 
|}

Louisiana 

|-
! 
| Albert Estopinal
|  | Democratic
| 1908
| Incumbent re-elected.
| 
|-
! 
| Henry Garland Dupré
|  | Democratic
| 1910
| Incumbent re-elected.
| 
|-
! 
| Robert F. Broussard
|  | Democratic
| 1896
|  | Incumbent retired to run for U.S. Senator.New member elected.Progressive gain.
| 
|-
! 
| John T. Watkins
|  | Democratic
| 1904
| Incumbent re-elected.
| 
|-
! 
| James Walter Elder
|  | Democratic
| 1912
|  | Incumbent lost renomination.New member elected. Democratic hold.
| 
|-
! 
| Lewis L. Morgan
|  | Democratic
| 1912
| Incumbent re-elected.
| 
|-
! 
| Ladislas Lazaro
|  | Democratic
| 1912
| Incumbent re-elected
| 
|-
! 
| James B. Aswell
|  | Democratic
| 1912
| Incumbent re-elected
| 
|}

Maine 

|-
! 
| Asher C. Hinds
|  | Republican
| 1910
| Incumbent re-elected.
| 
|-
! 
| Daniel J. McGillicuddy
|  | Democratic
| 1892
| Incumbent re-elected.
| 
|-
! 
| John A. Peters
|  | Republican
| 1913
| Incumbent re-elected.
| 
|-
! 
| Frank E. Guernsey
|  | Republican
| 1908
| Incumbent re-elected.
| 
|}

Maryland 

|-
! 
| colspan=3 | Vacant
|  | Rep. James Harry Covington (D) resigned September 30, 1914, to become Chief Justice of the Supreme Court of the District of Columbia.New member elected.Democratic hold.
| nowrap | 
|-
! 
| J. Frederick C. Talbott
|  | Democratic
| 1902
| Incumbent re-elected.
| nowrap | 
|-
! 
| Charles Pearce Coady
|  | Democratic
| 1913 
| Incumbent re-elected.
| nowrap | 
|-
! 
| John Charles Linthicum
|  | Democratic
| 1910
| Incumbent re-elected.
| nowrap | 
|-
! 
| Frank Owens Smith
|  | Democratic
| 1912
|  | Incumbent lost renomination.New member elected.Republican gain.
| nowrap | 
|-
! 
| David John Lewis
|  | Republican
| 1910
| Incumbent re-elected.
| nowrap | 
|}

Massachusetts 

|-
! 
| Allen T. Treadway
|  | Republican
| 1912
| Incumbent re-elected.
| nowrap | 
|-
! 
| Frederick H. Gillett
|  | Republican
| 1892
| Incumbent re-elected.
| nowrap | 
|-
! 
| Calvin Paige
|  | Republican
| 1913 
| Incumbent re-elected.
| nowrap | 
|-
! 
| Samuel E. Winslow
|  | Republican
| 1912
| Incumbent re-elected.
| nowrap | 
|-
! 
| Butler Ames
|  | Republican
| 1912
| Incumbent re-elected.
| nowrap | 
|-
! 
| Augustus Peabody Gardner
|  | Republican
| 1902 
| Incumbent re-elected.
| nowrap | 
|-
! 
| Michael F. Phelan
|  | Democratic
| 1912
| Incumbent re-elected.
| nowrap | 
|-
! 
| Frederick S. Deitrick
|  | Democratic
| 1912
| Incumbent re-elected.
| nowrap | 
|-
! 
| Ernest W. Roberts
|  | Republican
| 1898
| Incumbent re-elected.
| nowrap | 
|-
! 
| colspan="3" | Vacant
|  | Rep. William F. Murry (D) resigned September 28, 1914, to become Postmaster of Boston.New member elected.Democratic hold.
| nowrap | 
|-
! 
| colspan="3" | Vacant
|  | Rep. Andrew J. Peters (D) resigned August 15, 1914, to become United States Assistant Secretary of the Treasury.New member elected.Republican gain.
| nowrap |  
|-
! 
| James A. Gallivan
|  | Democratic
| 1914 
| Incumbent re-elected.
| nowrap |
|-
! 
| John Joseph Mitchell
|  | Democratic
| 1913 
|  | Incumbent lost re-election.New member elected.Republican gain.
| nowrap | 
|-
! 
| Edward Gilmore
|  | Democratic
| 1912
|  | Incumbent retired.New member elected.Democratic hold.
| nowrap | 
|-
! 
| William S. Greene
|  | Republican
| 1898 (special)
| Incumbent re-elected.
| nowrap | 
|-
! 
| Thomas Chandler Thacher
|  | Democratic
| 1912
|  | Incumbent lost re-election.New member elected.Republican gain.
| nowrap | 
|}

Michigan 

|-
! 
| Frank E. Doremus
|  | Democratic
| 1910
| Incumbent re-elected.
| nowrap | 
|-
! 
| Samuel W. Beakes
|  | Democratic
| 1912
| Incumbent re-elected.
| nowrap | 
|-
! 
| John M. C. Smith
|  | Republican
| 1910
| Incumbent re-elected.
| nowrap | 
|-
! 
| Edward L. Hamilton
|  | Republican
| 1896
| Incumbent re-elected.
| nowrap | 
|-
! 
| Carl E. Mapes
|  | Republican
| 1912
| Incumbent re-elected.
| nowrap | 
|-
! 
| Samuel W. Smith
|  | Republican
| 1896
|  | Incumbent retired.New member elected.Republican hold.
| nowrap | 
|-
! 
| Louis C. Cramton
|  | Republican
| 1912
| Incumbent re-elected.
| nowrap | 
|-
! 
| Joseph W. Fordney
|  | Republican
| 1898
| Incumbent re-elected.
| nowrap | 
|-
! 
| James C. McLaughlin
|  | Republican
| 1906
| Incumbent re-elected.
| nowrap | 
|-
! 
| Roy O. Woodruff
|  | Progressive
| 1912
|  | Incumbent lost re-election.New member elected.Republican gain.
| nowrap | 
|-
! 
| Francis O. Lindquist
|  | Republican
| 1912
|  | Incumbent retired.New member elected.Republican hold.
| nowrap | 
|-
! 
| William J. MacDonald
|  | Progressive
| 1912
|  | Incumbent lost re-election.New member elected.Republican gain.
| nowrap | 
|-
! 
| Patrick H. Kelley
|  | Republican
| 1912
|  | Incumbent ran for Michigan's 6th congressional district.New member elected.Republican hold.
| nowrap | 
|}

Minnesota 

|-
! 
| Sydney Anderson
|  | Republican
| 1910
| Incumbent re-elected.
| nowrap | 

|-
! 
| Winfield S. Hammond
|  | Democratic
| 1906
|  | Incumbent retired to run for Governor of Minnesota.New member elected.Republican gain.
| nowrap | 

|-
! 
| Charles R. Davis
|  | Republican
| 1902
| Incumbent re-elected.
| nowrap | 

|-
! 
| Frederick Stevens
|  | Republican
| 1896
|  | Incumbent lost re-election.New member elected.Democratic gain.
| nowrap | 

|-
! 
| George R. Smith
|  | Republican
| 1912
| Incumbent re-elected.
| nowrap | 

|-
! 
| Charles A. Lindbergh
|  | Republican
| 1906
| Incumbent re-elected.
| nowrap | 

|-
! 
| Andrew Volstead
|  | Republican
| 1902
| Incumbent re-elected.
| nowrap | 

|-
! 
| Clarence B. Miller
|  | Republican
| 1908
| Incumbent re-elected.
| nowrap | 

|-
! 
| Halvor Steenerson
|  | Republican
| 1902
| Incumbent re-elected.
| nowrap | 

|-
! 
| James Manahan
|  | Republican
| 1912
|  | Incumbent retired.New member elected.Progressive gain.
| nowrap | 

|}

Mississippi 

|-
! 
| Ezekiel S. Candler Jr.
|  | Democratic
| 1900
| Incumbent re-elected.
| nowrap | 

|-
! 
| Hubert D. Stephens
|  | Democratic
| 1910
| Incumbent re-elected.
| nowrap | 

|-
! 
| Benjamin G. Humphreys II
|  | Democratic
| 1902
| Incumbent re-elected.
| nowrap | 

|-
! 
| Thomas U. Sisson
|  | Democratic
| 1908
| Incumbent re-elected.
| nowrap | 

|-
! 
| Samuel A. Witherspoon
|  | Democratic
| 1910
| Incumbent re-elected.
| nowrap | 

|-
! 
| Pat Harrison
|  | Democratic
| 1910
| Incumbent re-elected.
| nowrap | 

|-
! 
| Percy Quin
|  | Democratic
| 1912
| Incumbent re-elected.
|  nowrap | 

|-
! 
| James Collier
|  | Democratic
| 1908
| Incumbent re-elected.
| nowrap | 

|}

Missouri 

|-
! 
| James T. Lloyd
|  | Democratic
| 1897
| Incumbent re-elected.
| nowrap | 
|-
! 
| William W. Rucker
|  | Democratic
| 1898
| Incumbent re-elected.
| nowrap | 
|-
! 
| Joshua W. Alexander
|  | Democratic
| 1906
| Incumbent re-elected.
| nowrap | 
|-
! 
| Charles F. Booher
|  | Democratic
| 1889
| Incumbent re-elected.
| nowrap | 
|-
! 
| William P. Borland
|  | Democratic
| 1908
| Incumbent re-elected.
| nowrap | 
|-
! 
| Clement C. Dickinson
|  | Democratic
| 1910
| Incumbent re-elected.
| nowrap | 
|-
! 
| Courtney W. Hamlin
|  | Democratic
| 1902
| Incumbent re-elected.
| nowrap | 
|-
! 
| Dorsey W. Shackleford
|  | Democratic
| 1899
| Incumbent re-elected.
| nowrap | 
|-
! 
| Champ Clark
|  | Democratic
| 1892
| Incumbent re-elected.
| nowrap | 
|-
! 
| Richard Bartholdt
|  | Republican
| 1892
|  | Incumbent retired.New member elected.Republican hold.
| nowrap | 
|-
! 
| William L. Igoe
|  | Democratic
| 1912
| Incumbent re-elected.
| nowrap | 
|-
! 
| Michael J. Gill
|  | Democratic
| 1898
|  | Incumbent lost renomination.New member elected.Republican gain.
| nowrap | 
|-
! 
| Walter L. Hensley
|  | Democratic
| 1910
| Incumbent re-elected.
| nowrap | 
|-
! 
| Joseph J. Russell
|  | Democratic
| 1904
| Incumbent re-elected.
| nowrap | 
|-
! 
| Perl D. Decker
|  | Democratic
| 1912
| Incumbent re-elected.
| nowrap | 
|-
! 
| Thomas L. Rubey
|  | Democratic
| 1910
| Incumbent re-elected.
| nowrap | 
|}

Montana 

|-
! rowspan=2 | 
| John M. Evans
|  | Democratic
| nowrap | 1912
| Incumbent re-elected.
| nowrap rowspan=2 | 

|-
| Tom Stout
|  | Democratic
| nowrap | 1912
| Incumbent re-elected.

|}

Nebraska 

|-
! 
| John A. Maguire
|  | Democratic
| 1908
|  | Incumbent lost re-election.New member elected.Republican gain.
| nowrap | 

|-
! 
| Charles O. Lobeck
|  | Democratic
| 1910
| Incumbent re-elected.
| nowrap | 

|-
! 
| Dan V. Stephens
|  | Democratic
| 1911 (special)
| Incumbent re-elected.
| nowrap | 

|-
! 
| Charles H. Sloan
|  | Republican
| 1910
| Incumbent re-elected.
| nowrap | 

|-
! 
| Silas R. Barton
|  | Republican
| 1912
|  | Incumbent lost re-election.New member elected.Democratic gain.
| nowrap | 

|-
! 
| Moses Kinkaid
|  | Republican
| 1902
| Incumbent re-elected.
| nowrap | 

|}

Nevada 

|-
! 
| Edwin E. Roberts
|  | Republican
| 1910
| Incumbent re-elected.
| nowrap | 

|}

New Hampshire 

|-
! 
| Eugene E. Reed
|  | Democratic
| 1912
|  | Incumbent lost re-election.New member elected.Republican gain.
| nowrap | 

|-
! 
| Raymond B. Stevens
|  | Democratic
| 1912
|  | Incumbent retired to run for U.S. Senator.New member elected.Republican gain.
| nowrap | 

|}

New Jersey 

|-
! 

|-
! 

|-
! 

|-
! 

|-
! 

|-
! 

|-
! 

|-
! 

|-
! 

|-
! 

|-
! 

|-
! 

|}

New Mexico 

|-
! 
| Harvey B. Fergusson
|  | Democratic
| 1911
|  | Incumbent lost re-election.New member elected.Republican gain.
| nowrap | 

|}

New York 

|-
! 
| Lathrop Brown
|  | Democratic
| 1912
|  | Incumbent lost re-election.New member elected.Republican gain.
| nowrap | 

|-
! 
| Denis O'Leary
|  | Democratic
| 1912
|  | Incumbent resigned to become Queens District Attorney.New member elected.Democratic hold.
| nowrap | 

|-
! 
| Frank E. Wilson
|  | Democratic
| 1910
|  | Incumbent lost renomination.New member elected.Democratic hold.
| nowrap | 

|-
! 
| Harry H. Dale
|  | Democratic
| 1912
| Incumbent re-elected.
| nowrap | 

|-
! 
| James P. Maher
|  | Democratic
| 1910
| Incumbent re-elected.
| nowrap | 

|-
! 
| William M. Calder
|  | Republican
| 1904
|  | Incumbent retired to run for U.S. Senator.New member elected.Republican hold.
| nowrap | 

|-
! 
| John J. Fitzgerald
|  | Democratic
| 1898
| Incumbent re-elected.
| nowrap | 

|-
! 
| Daniel J. Griffin
|  | Democratic
| 1912
| Incumbent re-elected.
| nowrap | 

|-
! 
| James H. O'Brien
|  | Democratic
| 1912
|  | Incumbent lost re-election.New member elected.Republican gain.
| nowrap | 

|-
! 
| Herman A. Metz
|  | Democratic
| 1912
|  | Incumbent lost renomination.New member elected.Republican gain.
| nowrap | 

|-
! 
| Daniel J. Riordan
|  | Democratic
| 1906 
| Incumbent re-elected.
| nowrap | 

|-
! 
| Henry M. Goldfogle
|  | Democratic
| 1900
|  | Incumbent lost re-election.New member elected.Socialist gain.
| nowrap | 

|-
! 
| George W. Loft
|  | Democratic
| 1913 
| Incumbent re-elected.
| nowrap | 

|-
! 
| Jefferson M. Levy
|  | Democratic
| 1910
|  | Incumbent lost renomination.New member elected.Democratic hold.
| nowrap | 

|-
! 
| Michael F. Conry
|  | Democratic
| 1908
| Incumbent re-elected.
| nowrap | 

|-
! 
| Peter J. Dooling
|  | Democratic
| 1912
| Incumbent re-elected.
| nowrap | 

|-
! 
| John F. Carew
|  | Democratic
| 1912
| Incumbent re-elected.
| nowrap | 

|-
! 
| Thomas G. Patten
|  | Democratic
| 1910
| Incumbent re-elected.
| nowrap | 

|-
! 
| Walter M. Chandler
|  | Progressive
| 1912
| Incumbent re-elected.
| nowrap | 

|-
! 
| Jacob A. Cantor
|  | Democratic
| 1913 
|  | Incumbent lost re-election.New member elected.Republican gain.
| nowrap | 

|-
! 
| Henry George Jr.
|  | Democratic
| 1910
|  | Incumbent lost renomination.New member elected.Democratic hold.
| nowrap | 

|-
! 
| Henry Bruckner
|  | Democratic
| 1912
| Incumbent re-elected.
| nowrap | 

|-
! 
| Joseph A. Goulden
|  | Democratic
| 1912
| Incumbent re-elected.
| nowrap | 

|-
! 
| Woodson R. Oglesby
|  | Democratic
| 1912
| Incumbent re-elected.
| nowrap | 

|-
! 
| Benjamin I. Taylor
|  | Democratic
| 1912
|  | Incumbent lost re-election.New member elected.Republican gain.
| nowrap | 

|-
! 
| Edmund Platt
|  | Republican
| 1912
| Incumbent re-elected.
| nowrap | 

|-
! 
| George McClellan
|  | Democratic
| 1912
|  | Incumbent lost re-election.New member elected.Republican gain.
| nowrap | 

|-
! 
| Peter G. Ten Eyck
|  | Democratic
| 1912
|  | Incumbent lost re-election.New member elected.Republican gain.
| nowrap | 

|-
! 
| James S. Parker
|  | Republican
| 1912
| Incumbent re-elected.
| nowrap | 

|-
! 
| Samuel Wallin
|  | Republican
| 1912
|  | Incumbent lost renomination.New member elected.Republican hold.
| nowrap | 

|-
! 
| Edwin A. Merritt
|  | Republican
| 1912 
| Incumbent re-elected.
| nowrap | 

|-
! 
| Luther W. Mott
|  | Republican
| 1910
| Incumbent re-elected.
| nowrap | 

|-
! 
| Charles A. Talcott
|  | Democratic
| 1910
|  | Incumbent lost re-election.New member elected.Republican gain.
| nowrap | 

|-
! 
| George W. Fairchild
|  | Republican
| 1906
| Incumbent re-elected.
| nowrap | 

|-
! 
| John R. Clancy
|  | Democratic
| 1912
|  | Incumbent lost re-election.New member elected.Republican gain.
| nowrap | 

|-
! 
| Sereno E. Payne
|  | Republican
| 1889 
| Incumbent re-elected.
| nowrap | 

|-
! 
| Edwin S. Underhill
|  | Democratic
| 1910
|  | Incumbent lost renomination.New member elected.Republican gain.
| nowrap | 

|-
! 
| Thomas B. Dunn
|  | Republican
| 1912
| Incumbent re-elected.
| nowrap | 

|-
! 
| Henry G. Danforth
|  | Republican
| 1910
| Incumbent re-elected.
| nowrap | 

|-
! 
| Robert H. Gittins
|  | Democratic
| 1912
|  | Incumbent lost re-election.New member elected.Republican gain.
| nowrap | 

|-
! 
| Charles B. Smith
|  | Democratic
| 1910
| Incumbent re-elected.
| nowrap | 

|-
! 
| Daniel A. Driscoll
|  | Democratic
| 1908
| Incumbent re-elected.
| nowrap | 

|-
! 
| Charles M. Hamilton
|  | Republican
| 1912
| Incumbent re-elected.
| nowrap | 

|}

North Carolina 

|-
! 

|-
! 

|-
! 

|-
! 

|-
! 

|-
! 

|-
! 

|-
! 

|-
! 

|-
! 

|}

North Dakota 

|-
! 
| Henry T. Helgesen
|  | Republican
| 1910
| Incumbent re-elected.
| nowrap | 

|-
! 
| George M. Young
|  | Republican
| 1912
| Incumbent re-elected.
| nowrap | 

|-
! 
| Patrick D. Norton
|  | Republican
| 1912
| Incumbent re-elected.
| nowrap | 

|}

Ohio 

|-
! 

|-
! 

|-
! 

|-
! 

|-
! 

|-
! 

|-
! 

|-
! 

|-
! 

|-
! 

|-
! 

|-
! 

|-
! 

|-
! 

|-
! 

|-
! 

|-
! 

|-
! 

|-
! 

|-
! 

|-
! 

|-
! 

|}

Oklahoma 

|-
! rowspan=2 | 
| Bird S. McGuire
| 
| 1907
|  | Incumbent retired.Republican loss.
| rowspan=2 nowrap | 
|-
| James S. Davenport
| 
| 1910
| Incumbent re-elected.

|-
! 
| colspan=3 | None 
|  | New seat.New member elected.Democratic gain.
| nowrap | 

|-
! 
| Charles D. Carter
| 
| 1907
| Incumbent re-elected.
| nowrap | 

|-
! 
| William H. Murray
| 
| 1912
| Incumbent re-elected.
| nowrap | 

|-
! rowspan=2 | 
| Joseph B. Thompson
| 
| 1912
| Incumbent re-elected.
| rowspan=2 nowrap | 
|-
| Claude Weaver
| 
| 1912
|  | Incumbent lost renomination.Democratic loss.

|-
! 
| Scott Ferris
| 
| 1907
| Incumbent re-elected.
| nowrap | 

|-
! 
| colspan=3 | None 
|  | New seat.New member elected.Democratic gain.
| nowrap | 

|-
! 
| Dick T. Morgan
| 
| 1908
| Incumbent re-elected.
| nowrap | 

|}

Oregon 

|-
! 
| Willis C. Hawley
|  | Republican
| 1906
| Incumbent re-elected.
| nowrap | 

|-
! 
| Nicholas J. Sinnott
|  | Republican
| 1912
| Incumbent re-elected.
| nowrap | 

|-
! 
| Walter Lafferty
|  | Republican
| 1910
|  | Incumbent lost re-election.New member elected.Republican hold.
| nowrap | 

|}

Pennsylvania 

|-
! 
| William S. Vare
| 
| 1912 
| Incumbent re-elected.
| nowrap | 

|-
! 
| George S. Graham
| 
| 1912
| Incumbent re-elected.
| nowrap | 

|-
! 
| J. Hampton Moore
| 
| 1906 
| Incumbent re-elected.
| nowrap | 

|-
! 
| George W. Edmonds
| 
| 1912
| Incumbent re-elected.
| nowrap | 

|-
! 
| Michael Donohoe
| 
| 1910
|  | Incumbent lost re-election.New member elected.Republican gain.
| nowrap | 

|-
! 
| J. Washington Logue
| 
| 1912
|  | Incumbent lost re-election.New member elected.Republican gain.
| nowrap | 

|-
! 
| Thomas S. Butler
| 
| 1896
| Incumbent re-elected.
| nowrap | 

|-
! 
| Robert E. Difenderfer
| 
| 1912
|  | Incumbent lost renomination.New member elected.Republican gain.
| nowrap | 

|-
! 
| William W. Griest
| 
| 1908
| Incumbent re-elected.
| nowrap | 

|-
! 
| John R. Farr
| 
| 1910
| Incumbent re-elected.
| nowrap | 

|-
! 
| John J. Casey
| 
| 1912
| Incumbent re-elected.
| nowrap | 

|-
! 
| Robert E. Lee
| 
| 1910
|  | Incumbent lost re-election.New member elected.Republican gain.
| nowrap | 

|-
! 
| John H. Rothermel
| 
| 1906
|  | Incumbent lost renomination.New member elected.Democratic hold.
| nowrap | 

|-
! 
| William D. B. Ainey
| 
| 1911 
|  | Incumbent retired.New member elected.Republican hold.
| nowrap | 

|-
! 
| Edgar R. Kiess
| 
| 1912
| Incumbent re-elected.
| nowrap | 

|-
! 
| John V. Lesher
| 
| 1912
| Incumbent re-elected.
| nowrap | 

|-
! 
| Franklin L. Dershem
| 
| 1912
|  | Incumbent lost re-election.New member elected.Republican gain.
| nowrap | 

|-
! 
| Aaron S. Kreider
| 
| 1912
| Incumbent re-elected.
| nowrap | 

|-
! 
| Warren W. Bailey
| 
| 1912
| Incumbent re-elected.
| nowrap | 

|-
! 
| Andrew R. Brodbeck
| 
| 1912
|  | Incumbent lost re-election.New member elected.Republican gain.
| nowrap | 

|-
! 
| Charles E. Patton
| 
| 1910
|  | Incumbent retired.New member elected.Republican hold.
| nowrap | 

|-
! 
| Abraham L. Keister
| 
| 1912
| Incumbent re-elected.
| nowrap | 

|-
! 
| Wooda N. Carr
| 
| 1912
|  | Incumbent lost re-election.New member elected.Republican gain.
| nowrap | 

|-
! 
| Henry W. Temple
|  | Progressive
| 1912
|  | Incumbent lost re-election.New member elected.Republican gain.
| nowrap | 

|-
! 
| Milton W. Shreve
| 
| 1912
|  | Incumbent lost re-election.New member elected.Democratic gain.
| nowrap | 

|-
! 
| A. Mitchell Palmer
| 
| 1908
|  | Incumbent retired to run for U.S. Senator.New member elected.Democratic hold.
| nowrap | 

|-
! 
| J. N. Langham
| 
| 1908
|  | Incumbent retired.New member elected.Republican hold.
| nowrap | 

|-
! 
| Willis J. Hulings
|  | Progressive
| 1912
|  | Incumbent lost re-election.New member elected.Republican gain.
| nowrap | 

|-
! 
| Stephen G. Porter
| 
| 1910
| Incumbent re-elected.
| nowrap | 

|-
! 
| M. Clyde Kelly
| 
| 1912
|  | Incumbent lost re-election as a Progressive.New member elected.Republican hold.
| nowrap | 

|-
! 
| John M. Morin
| 
| 1912
| Incumbent re-elected.
| nowrap | 

|-
! 
| Andrew J. Barchfeld
| 
| 1904
| Incumbent re-elected.
| nowrap | 

|-
! rowspan=4 | 
| Fred E. Lewis
| 
| 1912
|  | Incumbent retired.New member elected.Republican hold.
| rowspan=4 nowrap | 
|-
| James F. Burke
| 
| 1904
|  | Incumbent retired.New member elected.Republican hold.
|-
| Anderson H. Walters
| 
| 1912
|  | Incumbent lost re-election as a Progressive.New member elected.Republican hold.
|-
| Arthur R. Rupley
| 
| 1912
|  | Incumbent lost re-election as a Progressive.New member elected.Republican hold.

|}

Rhode Island 

|-
! 

|-
! 

|-
! 

|}

South Carolina 

|-
| 
| Richard S. Whaley
|  | Democratic
| 1913 (special)
| Incumbent re-elected.
| nowrap | 

|-
| 
| James F. Byrnes
|  | Democratic
| 1910
| Incumbent re-elected.
| nowrap | 

|-
| 
| Wyatt Aiken
|  | Democratic
| 1902
| Incumbent re-elected.
| nowrap | 

|-
| 
| Joseph T. Johnson
|  | Democratic
| 1900
| Incumbent re-elected.
| nowrap | 

|-
| 
| David E. Finley
|  | Democratic
| 1898
| Incumbent re-elected.
| nowrap | 

|-
| 
| J. Willard Ragsdale
|  | Democratic
| 1912
| Incumbent re-elected.
| nowrap | 

|-
| 
| Asbury F. Lever
|  | Democratic
| 1901 (special)
| Incumbent re-elected.
| nowrap | 

|}

South Dakota 

|-
! 
| Charles H. Dillon
|  | Republican
| 1912
| Incumbent re-elected.
| nowrap | 

|-
! 
| Charles H. Burke
|  | Republican
| 1908
|  | Incumbent retired to run for U.S. Senator.New member elected.Republican hold.
| nowrap | 

|-
! 
| Eben Martin
|  | Republican
| 1908
|  | Incumbent retired.New member elected.Democratic gain.
| nowrap | 

|}

Tennessee 

|-
! 
| Sam R. Sells
|  | Republican
| 1910
| Incumbent re-elected.
| nowrap | 

|-
! 
| Richard W. Austin
|  | Republican
| 1908
| Incumbent re-elected.
| nowrap | 

|-
! 
| John A. Moon
|  | Democratic
| 1896
| Incumbent re-elected.
| nowrap | 

|-
! 
| Cordell Hull
|  | Democratic
| 1906
| Incumbent re-elected.
|  nowrap | 

|-
! 
| William C. Houston
|  | Democratic
| 1904
| Incumbent re-elected.
| nowrap | 

|-
! 
| Jo Byrns
|  | Democratic
| 1908
| Incumbent re-elected.
| nowrap | 

|-
! 
| Lemuel P. Padgett
|  | Democratic
| 1900
| Incumbent re-elected.
| nowrap | 

|-
! 
| Thetus W. Sims
|  | Democratic
| 1896
| Incumbent re-elected.
| nowrap | 

|-
! 
| Finis J. Garrett
|  | Democratic
| 1904
| Incumbent re-elected.
| nowrap | 

|-
! 
| Kenneth McKellar
|  | Democratic
| 1911 (special)
| Incumbent re-elected.
| 

|}

Texas 

|-
! 

|-
! 

|-
! 

|-
! 

|-
! 

|-
! 

|-
! 

|-
! 

|-
! 

|-
! 

|-
! 

|-
! 

|-
! 

|-
! 

|-
! 

|-
! 

|-
! rowspan=2 | 

|}

Utah 

|-
! 
| Joseph Howell
|  | Republican
| 1902
| Incumbent re-elected.
| nowrap | 

|-
! 
| Jacob Johnson
|  | Republican
| 1912
|  | Incumbent lost renomination.New member elected.Democratic gain.
| nowrap | 

|}

Vermont 

|-
! 

|-
! 

|}

Virginia 

|-
! 

|-
! 

|-
! 

|-
! 

|-
! 

|-
! 

|-
! 

|-
! 

|-
! 

|-
! 
| Henry D. Flood
|  |Democratic
| 1900
| Incumbent re-elected.
| nowrap | 
|}

Washington 

|-
! 

|-
! 

|-
! 

|-
! 

|-
! 

|}

West Virginia 

|-
! 
| Matthew M. Neely
|  | Democratic
| 1913 (special)
| Incumbent re-elected.
| nowrap | 

|-
! 
| William G. Brown Jr.
|  | Democratic
| 1910
| Incumbent re-elected.
| nowrap | 

|-
! 
| Samuel B. Avis
|  | Republican
| 1912
|  | Incumbent lost re-election.New member elected.Democratic gain.
| nowrap | 

|-
! 
| Hunter H. Moss Jr.
|  | Republican
| 1912
| Incumbent re-elected.
| nowrap | 

|-
! 
| James A. Hughes
|  | Republican
| 1900
|  | Incumbent retired.New member elected.Republican hold.
| nowrap | 

|-
! 
| Howard Sutherland
|  | Republican
| 1912
| Incumbent re-elected.
| nowrap | 

|}

Wisconsin 

|-
! 

|-
! 

|-
! 

|-
! 

|-
! 

|-
! 

|-
! 

|-
! 

|-
! 

|-
! 

|-
! 

|}

Wyoming 

|-
! 
| Frank Wheeler Mondell
|  | Republican
| 1898
| Incumbent re-elected.
| nowrap | 

|}

Non-voting delegates

Alaska Territory 

Starting with this election, Alaska Territory elected its non-voting delegate on the same day as the rest of the states' general elections.  Incumbent James Wickersham, after serving one term as a Progressive, returned to the Republican Party.

|-
| 
| James Wickersham
|  | Progressive
| 1908
|  | Incumbent re-elected as a Republican.Republican gain.
| nowrap | 

|}

See also
 1914 United States elections
 1914 United States Senate elections
 63rd United States Congress
 64th United States Congress

Notes

References

Bibliography

External links
 Office of the Historian (Office of Art & Archives, Office of the Clerk, U.S. House of Representatives)